Upper Saucon Township is a township in Lehigh County, Pennsylvania. It is part of the Lehigh Valley metropolitan area, which had a population of 861,899 and was the 68th most populous metropolitan area in the U.S. as of the 2020 census. The township had a population of 14,808 as of the 2010 census.

History
The area that today is Upper Saucon Township originally was populated by the Unami division of the Lenape native people (also called the Delaware people). The name Saucon comes from the native word Saukunk, meaning "mouth of the creek", that being the location of a Lenape village.

Established in 1743, Upper Saucon was originally part of Bucks County, one of the three initial counties established by William Penn in 1682. In 1752, Northampton County was carved off of Bucks County and encompassed Upper Saucon. Later, in 1812, Lehigh County was carved from Northampton, thus Upper Saucon became part of Lehigh County.

Geography
Its boundary with Salisbury Township is located on South Mountain. Upper Saucon is in the Delaware River watershed and is drained by Saucon Creek into the Lehigh River, except for a very small area in the extreme south just southwest of Locust Valley, which is drained by Unami Creek into Perkiomen Creek and the Schuylkill River.

Upper Saucon Township has a hot summer humid continental climate (Dfa) and is in hardiness zone 6b.

Adjacent municipalities
Lower Milford Township (southwest)
Upper Milford Township (west)
Salisbury Township (northwest)
Lower Saucon Township, Northampton County (northeast)
Springfield Township, Bucks County (southeast)
Milford Township, Bucks County (tangent to the south)

Upper Saucon surrounds the borough of Coopersburg.

Notable villages
Center Valley
Colesville 
Friedensville
Lanark
Limeport 
Locust Valley
Spring Valley
Summit Lawn

Demographics

As of the census of 2000, there were 11,939 people, 3,970 households, and 3,283 families residing in the township.  The population density was 483.9 people per square mile (186.9/km2).  There were 4,117 housing units at an average density of 166.9/sq mi (64.4/km2).  The racial makeup of the township was 97.11% White, 0.70% African American, 0.06% Native American, 1.13% Asian, 0.01% Pacific Islander, 0.40% from other races, and 0.59% from two or more races. Hispanic or Latino of any race were 1.07% of the population.

There were 3,970 households, out of which 37.3% had children under the age of 18 living with them, 74.2% were married couples living together, 5.8% had a female householder with no husband present, and 17.3% were non-families. 13.6% of all households were made up of individuals, and 5.6% had someone living alone who was 65 years of age or older.  The average household size was 2.79 and the average family size was 3.07.

In the township, the population was spread out, with 24.0% under the age of 18, 11.1% from 18 to 24, 26.1% from 25 to 44, 27.2% from 45 to 64, and 11.7% who were 65 years of age or older.  The median age was 39 years. For every 100 females, there were 99.7 males.  For every 100 females age 18 and over, there were 97.1 males. The median income for a household in the township was $66,703, and the median income for a family was $73,381. Males had a median income of $50,041 versus $30,165 for females. The per capita income for the township was $27,606.  About 0.9% of families and 1.8% of the population were below the poverty line, including 1.6% of those under age 18 and 3.1% of those age 65 or over.

Education

Colleges and universities
DeSales University, Penn State Lehigh Valley, and Strayer University-Allentown campus are each located in the township.

Public education
Upper Saucon Township is served by the Southern Lehigh School District. Upper Saucon Township students in grades nine through 12 attend Southern Lehigh High School in the district.

Recreation
Upper Saucon Township Community Park was dedicated on May 18, 1996, and was designed to meet the current and future recreational needs of the Township's residents. The park covers approximately 70 acres and is conveniently located in the central portion of the Township.

Upper Saucon Township is home to The Promenade Shops at Saucon Valley, which opened in 2006. Saucon Valley Country Club, featuring three 18-hold golf courses and a six-hole beginners course, also is located in the township.

Economy
In 2006, Olympus Corporation opened its U.S. headquarters in the township.

Board of Supervisors
Upper Saucon is a second-class township and elects five at-large supervisors.
Dennis Benner, Chairman
Brian Farrell, Vice Chairman
 Stephen Wagner
 Philip Spaeth
 Kimberly Stehlik

Transportation

Roads and highways

Upper Saucon has three north-to-south numbered routes: Pennsylvania Route 309, Pennsylvania Route 145, and Pennsylvania Route 378. In Lanark, 309 comes north from Philadelphia via Quakertown to join Interstate 78 coming east from New York City and cross the mountain to Allentown.

PA 145 and PA 378 come south from Center City Allentown and Bethlehem, respectively, to meet PA 309 in Lanark and Center Valley, respectively. Other major roads in the township include Beverly Hills Road, Blue Church Road, Blue Church Road South, Center Valley Parkway/Saucon Valley Road, Lanark Road, Limeport Pike, Locust Valley Road (turns into Allentown Road in Lower Milford Township before exiting Lehigh County), Main Street (in Center Valley), Oakhurst Drive/Vera Cruz Road, and Passer Road.

Public transportation
LANta Route 323 serves Upper Saucon to and from Allentown.

Notable people

Joseph Fry Jr., former U.S. Congressman
Mike Portnoy, progressive metal drummer

References

External links

Townships in Lehigh County, Pennsylvania
Townships in Pennsylvania